The Hackett Lake is located in the Hackett (township) in the unorganized territory of Lac-Masketsi, in the Mekinac Regional County Municipality, in the administrative region of Mauricie, in Quebec, in Canada.

Toponymy 

The names "Hackett Lake" and "Hackett (township)" evoke the memory of Michael Felix Hackett (1851-1926), secretary and "registrar" in the firm Edmund James Flynn, Prime Minister Quebec in 1896 and 1897. After his studies at the McGill University, Hackett is admitted to the Bar of Quebec in 1874. Thereafter, it will be mayor of Stanstead Plain from 1890 to 1904, Conservative MP for the Legislative Assembly from 1892 to 1900, then a judge of the Superior Court of the District of Bedford from 1915.

The toponym "Lake Hackett" was officially registered on December 5, 1968, at the Bank of place names in Commission de toponymie du Québec (Geographical Names Board of Québec).

Geography 
Lake Hackett (Mekinac) has a length of 4.8 km in the north-south axis (and a maximum width of 1.7 km), including the long strait in the southern part, resulting into the "Lac du Canard" (Duck Lake) which as a large area consisting of marshes. The headwaters of the subwatershed is Calau lake (1 km long) which flows to the north-east into the Suève lake (710 m long). The discharge of the later flows over 1.25 km to the northeast and empties into "Lac du Canard".

A strait of 2.8 km at northeast (which forms the lake logic) connects the Hackett Lake to Garneau Lake (2.6 km long, shaped like a "U"). South of the later, the Heloise lake (1.8 km long) connects the Garneau Lake with a short Strait. The Heloise lake straddles the township Hackett and Marmier.

Dam of type "concrete-gravity" that was built on the rock by Hydro-Québec in 1995 at the mouth of Lake Hackett, creates the great reservoir "Hackett" an area of 438.8 ha with a holding capacity 19,305,000 m³. With a length of 20 m., the dam has a height of 5.5 m and a height of 4.4 m holding. Coordinates of the dam: latitude: 47° 05'; longitude: - 72° 27' 

Located in the Zec Tawachiche, its mouth flows into the "Ruisseau des îles" (Stream of Islands), which course on 3.25 km north-west and flows into the Rivière aux eaux mortes (Mékinac). The latter flows into the Rivière du Milieu (Mékinac) which goes south to empty into the northern part of Mékinac Lake.

Starting at Hervey-Jonction, visitors can travel 30 km to reach the southern part of Lake Hackett. A visitor has just to take the Tawachiche road leading to Zec Tawachiche (in north-east), through the Audy sector; then take the Tawachiche East road, passing near the Lake Terrien (Mékinac).

Related Items 
 Michael Felix Hackett
 Hackett (township)
 Mekinac Regional County Municipality
 Lac-Masketsi, unorganized territory
 Mékinac Lake
 Trois-Rives municipality
 Lac-aux-Sables municipality
 Zec Tawachiche
 Mauricie
 Tawachiche River
 Rivière aux eaux mortes (Mékinac)
 Tawachiche West River

References

External links 

 Regional County Municipality (RCM) Mekinac:  

Lakes of Mauricie